Wink is a South Korean trot music duo. They debuted on February 12, 2008, with the single "Match Made in Heaven".

Discography

Singles

Awards and nominations

References

External links
Official blog (Korean)

Trot groups
South Korean girl groups
South Korean musical duos
Twin musical duos
Identical twin females
Female musical duos